32nd parallel may refer to:

32nd parallel north, a circle of latitude in the Northern Hemisphere
32nd parallel south, a circle of latitude in the Southern Hemisphere